Afton is an unincorporated community in Greene County, Tennessee.

Toponymy
It is believed that the community's name comes from Robert Burns's song "Sweet Afton", about the River Afton in Scotland.

History

In the early 1960s, construction began on a new U.S. Post Office in Afton. It was built by Modern Woodman of America.

Geography
Some of Afton has been annexed by the town of Greeneville and the city of Tusculum.

Attractions and amenities

Middle Creek Blueberry Farm is a u-pick farm that grows blueberries, strawberries, blackberries and raspberries. The farm is currently closed.

Education
There are three schools in Afton, including an elementary, elementary middle school, and Chuckey-Doak High School.

References

Unincorporated communities in Greene County, Tennessee
Unincorporated communities in Tennessee
Tusculum, Tennessee